Hugh Hoare may refer to:

Hugh Edward Hoare (1854–1929), British brewer and Liberal politician
Sir Hugh Richard Hoare, 4th Baronet (1787–1857) of the Hoare baronets